Following the 2011 Libyan Civil War, Libyan Airlines offers scheduled flights to the following destinations:

References

Libyan Airlines
Lists of airline destinations
Airline destinations